Spy is a 2015 South Korean television series based on the Israeli drama The Gordin Cell but modified to depict North/South Korean relations. A family drama with spy thriller elements, it starred Kim Jae-joong as a genius analyst working for the National Intelligence Service (NIS), while Bae Jong-ok played his mother, an ex-spy from North Korea.

SPY aired two episodes a week back to back on Fridays on KBS2 from January 9 to March 6, 2015 for a total of 16 episodes.

Plot
The fictional story begins after the execution of real-life North Korean general Jang Sung-taek. One day an order comes down from North Korea, reactivating erstwhile spy Park Hye-rim who has spent decades in South Korea as an ordinary housewife. She is given the mission to turn and bring in her own son, Kim Sun-woo. Cool-headed, quick-witted genius Sun-woo is an information analyst on North Korea working for the NIS. His girlfriend Yoon-jin is a tour guide for Chinese tourists who cannot speak Chinese, and they fell in love when Sun-woo helped her translate. Hye-rim is suddenly forced to choose between her son and country, and risks her life to see the choice through.

Cast and characters

Main characters

Kim's family

Members of NIS

Ki-chul's men

Episodes

Original soundtrack
Code No.1（Date: January 9, 2015）

Code No.2（Date: January 16, 2015）

Code No.3（Date：January 23, 2015）

Code No.4（Date：February 6, 2015）

Code No.5（Date：February 13, 2015）

Ratings 
 In the table above, the blue numbers represent the lowest ratings and the red numbers represent the highest ratings.
NR denotes that the drama did not rank in the top 20 daily programs on that date

References

External links 
  
 
 
 

2015 South Korean television series debuts
2015 South Korean television series endings
Korean Broadcasting System television dramas
Korean-language television shows
South Korean television series based on non-South Korean television series
South Korean thriller television series
South Korean action television series
South Korean espionage television series
National Intelligence Service (South Korea) in fiction
International television series based on Israeli television series